David Arturovich Paravyan (born 8 March 1998) is a Russian chess player of Armenian descent, who was awarded the title of grandmaster by FIDE in 2017.

Chess career
Born in Moscow, Paravyan received the international master title in 2013 and the grandmaster title in 2017.

In February 2018, Paravyan participated in the Aeroflot Open tournament. He finished eleventh out of 92, scoring 5½ points from 9 games (+4–2=3). The following year, Paravyan competed in the FIDE Grand Swiss Tournament 2019, held on the Isle of Man from 10 to 21 October. He won the Gibraltar Masters open tournament in January 2020. After tying for first on a score of 7½/10 (+5–0=5), Paravyan won a four-way playoff to take the title. He defeated Wang Hao in the finals.

References

External links
 
 
 
 
 drop_stone player profile at Lichess.org

1998 births
Living people
Chess grandmasters
Russian chess players
Russian people of Armenian descent
Sportspeople from Moscow